New Burlington is an unincorporated community in Delaware County, Indiana, in the United States.

History
A post office was established at New Burlington in 1838, and remained in operation until it was discontinued in 1901.

References

Unincorporated communities in Delaware County, Indiana
Unincorporated communities in Indiana